Edgarosaurus is a genus of polycotylid plesiosaur from the Thermopolis Shale, containing one species, E. muddi. The type specimen was found in Early Cretaceous (late Albian) rocks in the state of Montana in the United States.  At the time, this location was covered by part of the Western Interior Seaway. Edgarosaurus was one of the first polycotylids that evolved to become native to the Western Interior Seaway.

The holotype (which is currently the only known specimen) consists of the skull, neck, parts of the spine and the left front flipper.

History of study
The well-preserved holotype specimen of Edgarosaurus (MOR 751) was found in the Shell Creek Member, the uppermost of the three members of the Thermopolis Shale, during the spring of 1993. The specimen's skull is complete and was preserved in articulation with a series 25 cervical (neck) vertebrae. An additional cervical vertebra, three pectoral (shoulder) vertebrae, and two dorsal (back) vertebrae were found isolated at the site, but articulate to form a series with the other 25 cervical vertebrae. Three other dorsal vertebrae were also recovered, though they do not seem to belong to this string of vertebrae. An almost complete front paddle is also known. Edgarosaurus muddi was named in 2002 by Pat S. Druckenmiller. The generic name refers to the nearby location of Edgar, Montana, while the specific name honors Kevin Mudd.

Description

Each premaxilla (front upper tooth bearing bone) contains either six or seven teeth. The top of skull of Edgarosaurus possesses a small opening towards its back known as a pineal foramen. The back of the skull is vertical, rather than sloping. Each side of the braincase is perforated by a circular hole. The front ends of each half of the mandible are fused together to form a mandibular symphysis. There are six tooth pairs situated on the symphysis, a low number for a polycotylid. Edgarosaurus has large, fang-like teeth.

The neck of Edgarosaurus is short for a plesiosaur, containing a total of 26 vertebrae. The neck and skull together were estimated by Druckenmiller to comprise up to 45% of the animal's length. The lower arm bones of Edgarosaurus are very short and wide. The first digit of its forelimb consists of seven bones, the second eleven, and the third ten, while the fourth and fifth bear nine.

See also

 List of plesiosaur genera
 Timeline of plesiosaur research

Sources

Early Cretaceous plesiosaurs of North America
Polycotylids
Fossil taxa described in 2002
Sauropterygian genera